Sool is a 2008 album released by German electronic musician Ellen Allien, released on her BPitch Control music label. It is her sixth studio album.

Track listing 
"Einsteigen" – 3:08
"Caress" – 4:29
"Bim" – 5:30
"Sprung" – 4:59
"Elphine" – 4:48
"Zauber" – 4:44
"Its" – 6:43
"Ondu" – 4:26
"Frieda" - 4:29
"MM" - 4:51
"Out" - 4:44

Ellen Allien albums
2008 albums
BPitch Control albums